Anílton da Conceição (born 15 March 1968) is a Brazilian football coach and former player who coaches Hong Kong University Graduates Association Primary School. He played as a midfielder for São Paulo, Buler Rangers, Kitchee, South China. In 2009, he became the assistant coach for South China.

Managerial career 
Anílton has been working as a coach for HKUGAPS since 2006 and coaches the school team which came fourth in the Eastern Cup. In addition, he was the assistant coach of South China Football Club, and be responsible to help the club to find good foreign players in Western Countries and Brazil. Coach Kim and he are great partners. He also helps Yes Brazil.

He is finish the assistant coach of Hong Kong national football team at September 2022, he service about 11 years. ON 24 September 2022, Hong Kong fans thanks to Anílton for his efforts for the Hong Kong national football team and play football at Hong Kong.

References

External links
Profile at Globo Esporte's Futpedia

1968 births
Living people
Brazilian footballers
Association football midfielders
São Paulo FC players
Hong Kong First Division League players
Hong Kong Rangers FC players
South China AA players
Kitchee SC players
Hong Kong League XI representative players
Brazilian expatriate footballers
Brazilian expatriate sportspeople in Hong Kong
Expatriate footballers in Hong Kong